Description of Africa (in the original archaic Dutch Naukeurige Beschrijvinge der Afrikaensche Gewesten, or "Accurate Descriptions of the African Regions") is a Dutch ethnographic book published in 1668 describing Africa. The work consists of detailed description of the parts of Africa known to Europeans in the mid-seventeenth century and was written by the geographer Olfert Dapper.

Book
Among other things, the book contains a rare description of the Kingdom of Benin which explicitly mentions the Benin Bronzes.

Dapper never visited Africa himself, but relied very heavily on records of the Dutch West India Company, especially a collection made by Samuel Bloomaerts, one of its officials. The records which Dapper used are no longer extant, however, as searches for the original reports and letters in the archives of the company, held by the Dutch National Archive, have not produced anything original.

It was first published in Amsterdam by Jacob van Meurs in 1668, and a second edition appeared in 1676.  A German translation was issued in 1670, as was the English translation, often attributed to John Ogilby, as Africa in 1670.  A French translation also appeared in 1676.  All of these translations have problems with occasional mistranslations but more significantly, abbreviation of the contents.  The German and English versions are the most faithful, both in translation and inclusion of the original material, the French edition is generally regarded as quite deficient.

The illustrations of Central Africa were probably based on work by Abraham Willaerts who accompanied the Dutch expedition against Portuguese Angola in 1641.  The illustration of Mbanza Kongo matches very well with the topography of the site, the location of wells and the position of the Jesuit church.  Other illustrations are generally notable for faithfully presenting cloth, clothing, tools and weapons.

Citations

References

Bibliography

External links

Original text of the book at Google Books
Original text at Archive.org

1668 books
Geography books
Books about Africa
17th-century Dutch books
Dutch West India Company